Ningxia Campaign or Ningxia War may refer to:

 Ordos Campaign (1592), also known as Ningxia Campaign
 War in Ningxia (1934)
 Ningxia Campaign (1949)

See also
 Mongol conquest of Western Xia, largely fought in Ningxia